Oxynoemacheilus persa is a species of ray-finned fish in the genus Oxynoemacheilus. The species is found in Urmia Lake and the Polvar and Kor rivers in western Iran.

Footnotes 
 

persa
Taxa named by Johann Jakob Heckel
Fish described in 1848